The Free Pascal Runtime Library, abbreviated RTL, is Free Pascal's runtime library.

The RTL consists of a collection of units that provide components and classes for general programming tasks. It acts as a basis for Free Pascal's Free Component Library (FCL) and the Lazarus Component Library (LCL). The RTL is licensed under the LGPL with a static linking exception.

Further reading

External links 
 RTL documentation in the Free Pascal Wiki
 Complete online reference

Free Pascal
Pascal (programming language) libraries
Computer libraries
Platform-sensitive development
Software using the LGPL license